Chalmers is a  Scottish surname. Notable people with this surname include:

Alan Chalmers (born 1939), British philosopher of science
Alexander Chalmers (1759–1834),  Scottish writer
Andrew Chalmers (actor) (born 1992), Canadian actor
Andrew Chalmers (footballer) (born 1899), Scottish professional footballer
Andrew Chalmers (rugby league) New Zealand businessman and rugby league player
Angela Chalmers (born 1963), Canadian middle-distance athlete
Brett Chalmers (born 1973), Australian rules footballer
Bruce Chalmers (1907–1990), American metallurgist
Christopher Chalmers (born 1967), Canadian freestyle swimmer
Craig Chalmers (born 1968), Scottish rugby union player
David Chalmers (born 1966), Australian philosopher and cognitive scientist 
Floyd Chalmers (1898–1993), Canadian editor, publisher and philanthropist
George Chalmers (antiquarian) (1742–1825), Scottish antiquarian
George Paul Chalmers (1833–1878), Scottish painter
George Chalmers (baseball) (1888–1960), American baseball player
Greg Chalmers (born 1973), Australian professional golfer
Iain Chalmers (born 1943), British health services researcher
Jackie Chalmers (1885– ?), Scottish footballer
James Chalmers (actor) (born 1974), British actor
James Chalmers (inventor) (1782–1853), Scottish inventor of the adhesive postage stamp
James Chalmers (missionary) (1841–1901), Scottish missionary
James Ronald Chalmers (1831–1898), American politician
Lt. Col. James Chalmers, Scottish-born loyalist officer during the American Revolution
Jim Chalmers (born 1978), Australian politician
Jim Chalmers (New South Wales politician) (1901–1986), member of the New South Wales Legislative Assembly from 1947 to 1956
Jimmy Chalmers (1877–1915), Scottish footballer
Joan Chalmers (1928–2016), Canadian philanthropist
John George Chalmers (1874–1962), American football coach
Joseph W. Chalmers (1806–1853), U.S. Senator from Mississippi
Judith Chalmers (born 1935), English television presenter
Kyle Chalmers (born 1998), Australian swimmer 
Lewis Chalmers (born 1986), Association football player for Aldershot Town
Lionel Chalmers (born 1980), American basketball player
Logan Chalmers (born 2000), Scottish footballer
Sir Mackenzie Chalmers (1847–1927), British civil servant, judge, pioneer legislative draftsman
Mario Chalmers (born 1986), American basketball player
Nathanael Chalmers (born 1830), Scottish-born pastoralist, explorer, politician mainly of New Zealand
Patrick R. Chalmers (1872–1942), Irish writer
Paul Chalmers (born 1963), Scottish footballer
Stevie Chalmers (1936–2019), Scottish footballer
Robert Chalmers (1858–1938), British official, Permanent Secretary to the Treasury, Governor of Ceylon; Pali scholar 
Thomas Chalmers (1780–1847), scholar, theologian, leader of the Free Church of Scotland
Thomas Chalmers (rugby player) (1850–1926), Scottish rugby player
Thomas C. Chalmers (1917–1995), American medical researcher
Thomas Hardie Chalmers (1884–1966), American actor and opera singer
Walter Chalmers, British locomotive engineer
William Chalmers (merchant) (1748–1811), Swedish 18th century businessman and the founder of Chalmers University of Technology

Fictional characters
Superintendent Chalmers, school administrator on The Simpsons
Detective Chalmers, Intra Solar System Police officer on Cowboy Bebop

See also 
 Chalmers (disambiguation)

English-language surnames
Surnames of Lowland Scottish origin
Occupational surnames
English-language occupational surnames